Spying on United Nations leaders by United States diplomats was confirmed by a 2009 confidential directive from the United States Department of State directly instructing US diplomats to spy on top officials of the United Nations. The intelligence information to be gathered included biometric information and passwords and other authentication keys used in  official communications. The directives were revealed as part of the United States diplomatic cables leak in late 2010. While spying by the US on the UN was not new, the directive's aggressive goals for information gathering and desire for use of regular diplomats in the gathering was seen by some as new, and caused a strain in relations between the US and UN.

The former British ambassador to the United States, said that it would be a "serious misinterpretation" to conclude that the cables were asking diplomats to spy, calling it part of the vast bureaucratic laundry list dumped on diplomats.

The directive
In July 2009, a confidential cable originating from the United States Department of State ordered US diplomats to spy on Ban Ki-moon, Secretary-General of the United Nations, and other top UN officials. The intelligence information the diplomats were ordered to gather included biometric information (which apparently included DNA, fingerprints, and iris scans), passwords, and personal encryption keys used in private and commercial networks for official communications. It also included Internet and intranet usernames, e-mail addresses, web site URLs useful for identification, credit card numbers, frequent flier account numbers, and work schedules. The targeted human intelligence was requested in a process known as the National Humint Collection Directive, and was aimed at foreign diplomats of US allies as well.

The news of the cable and directive was revealed by website WikiLeaks on 28 November 2010, as part of the overall United States diplomatic cables leak.

The disclosed cables on the more aggressive intelligence gathering went back to 2008 when they went out under Condoleezza Rice's name during her tenure as Secretary of State and continued to go out under US Secretary of State Hillary Clinton's name. US State Department spokesman Philip J. Crowley stated that Clinton had not drafted the directive and that the Secretary of State's name is systematically attached to the bottom of cables originating from Washington. Further leaked material revealed that the guidance in the cables was actually written by the Central Intelligence Agency before being sent out under Clinton's name, as the CIA cannot directly instruct State Department personnel. Specifically, the effort came from the National Clandestine Service, a CIA service formed in the years following the September 11, 2001 terrorist attacks with the goal of better coordinating human intelligence activities. 

According to former US officials, the instructions given in these cables may have been largely ignored by American diplomats as ill-advised.

Breach of international laws
The UN had previously declared that spying on the secretary-general was illegal, as a breach of the 1946 UN convention. Peter Kemp, Solicitor of the Supreme Court of New South Wales, and international-law professor Ben Saul, publicly asked Julia Gillard, Prime Minister of Australia, to complain "to the U.S. about both Secretaries of State Condoleezza Rice and Hillary Clinton being in major breach of International law ie UN Covenants, by making orders to spy on UN personnel, including the Secretary General, to include theft of their credit card details and communication passwords. Perhaps the Attorney General should investigate this clear prima facie evidence of crime (likely against Australian diplomats as well), rather than he attempts to prosecute the messenger of those crimes." President of Venezuela Hugo Chávez said that Clinton should resign.

International reactions
The practice of the US and the State Department gathering intelligence on the UN was not new. Former UN diplomats commented that UN officials already work under the assumption that they are spied on and are used to getting around it, but that it was the responsibility of intelligence agencies, not other diplomats. The Guardian wrote that the directive "appears to blur the line between diplomacy and spying".

 
Staff at the UN privately expressed unhappiness at the apparent scale of the intelligence-gathering operation, and the UN sought an official explanation from the US. On 1 December, Clinton and Ban met at a summit of the Organization for Security and Co-operation in Europe in Astana, Kazakhstan, where Clinton was doing damage control with world leaders regarding the embarrassing contents of the State Department cables overall.  In an attempt to repair the strain for the Humint revelations, Clinton expressed regret for the disclosures, but did not make an apology per se. A UN statement relayed that Ban thanked Clinton "for clarifying the matter and for expressing her concern about the difficulties created."

Germany Ministry of the Interior Thomas de Maizière said he was "astounded" by the order, though he expressed regret that Wikileaks activity was being focused on "transparent and open Western democracies" instead of "the world's dictatorships and oppressive regimes" and thus lacked "genuine informative purpose". Former US official Carl Ford called the order "unprecedented", although "other U.S. diplomats said such headquarters directives were a longtime and routine practice", albeit one which was "not always fully obeyed."

The Guardian quoted Carne Ross, "a former British diplomat at the UN who now runs the Independent Diplomat advisory group", as saying that "The fact that the US is spying on the UN can't be a surprise. Lots of countries do it, including our own." Christopher Meyer, a former British ambassador to the United States, said that it would be a "serious misinterpretation" to conclude that the cables were asking diplomats to spy, adding that "In reality this is the usual vast bureaucratic laundry list dumped by the US intelligence establishment on diplomats around the world asking them to do a number of things".

See also
 Crypto AG, company owned by U.S. intel purportedly to spy on other countries
 Dropmire
 Operation Dunhammer, leaked instance of U.S. spying on European leaders
 German Parliamentary Committee investigation of the NSA spying scandal

References

External links
 The original cable at WikiLeaks. Archived on 24 April 2012.
 
 

Espionage in the United States
United States diplomatic cables leak
2010s in mass media
Espionage scandals and incidents
Geopolitical rivalry
Hillary Clinton
United States and the United Nations
United States government secrecy